The Rivière l'Estère is a river of Haiti.

See also
List of rivers of Haiti

References

Rivers of Haiti